The Tipo Carora or Carora is a Venezuelan breed of dairy cattle. It was bred in the early part of the twentieth century by crossing of local Criollo cows with imported Brown Swiss bulls. It is named for its place of origin, the town of Carora in the Venezuelan state of Lara.

History 

Breeding of the Tipo Carora began in the 1930s in the Venezuelan state of Lara, in western central Venezuela. Brown Swiss bulls from Europe and North America were used to live cover cows of the Amarillo de Quebrada Arriba, a local breed of Criollo cattle which was well adapted to the tropical conditions of the area, until about 85% of the genotype of the resulting stock derived from the Brown Swiss. During the 1980s there was a sharp fall in breed numbers. In 1992, the breed was denominated a "Patrimonio Nacional" or national heritage; a programme of genetic improvement was begun, and a herd-book was established. In 2013 the registered population numbered 13 682 cows and 644 bulls.

Characteristics 

The Carora has black skin and a white or pale fawn-coloured coat. In approximately 90% of the cattle, the hair of the coat is glossy and short; this is caused by the slick hair gene often found in Criollo cattle. Selection for this characteristic in the Carora is intentional: bulls found – through observation of their male progeny – not to be homozygous for it are killed.

Use 

The Carora was created as a dairy breed capable of producing well in a tropical climate. Carora bulls – or semen from them – are extensively used for cross-breeding, both with Holstein cows to produce dairy animals with good tolerance of heat, and with cows of indicine breeds to produce dual-purpose cattle.

References

Dairy cattle breeds
Cattle breeds originating in Venezuela
Cattle breeds